Zachary E. Veach (born December 9, 1994) is an American auto racing driver who competes full time in the IMSA SportsCar Championship GT3 class for Vasser Sullivan.

Veach was named to CNN's list of "Intriguing People" in May 2010, is the national spokesperson for FocusDriven, and released his first book, 99 Things Teens Wish They Knew Before Turning 16 on NBC's The Today Show on March 2, 2011.

Racing career

Early career
Veach began racing at age 12 when he was "discovered" by current IndyCar Series team owner Sarah Fisher's dad, Dave Fisher.  In 19 months Veach had gone from go-karts to the cockpit of an open-wheel Formula BMW machine. Near the end of 2009, while testing a Formula BMW, Atlantic Championship team owner Eric Jensen signed Veach to his team for the 2010 Atlantic Championship season.  In early March 2010, the Series halted operations.

U.S. F2000 National Championship

In his first year as a driver in the U.S. F2000 National Championship for Andretti Autosport, Veach had 10 top-five finishes and four podium results. Despite entering the series after the season-opener (St. Pete) and therefore missing out on two rounds of race points, he managed to finish fifth in the driver championship point standings. His performances also contributed to Andretti Autosport securing the team championship for the 2010 season.  He was also named a semi-finalist for Sports Illustrated's annual Sports Kid of the Year award.

On December 9, Andretti Autosport announced they had re-signed Veach to again compete in the USF2000 National Championship and WinterFest in 2011.

In January 2011, Veach won the 2011 U.S. F2000 Winterfest – a winter race series held in Florida. Veach won two of the five races and won the title by six points over Andretti teammate Spencer Pigot. Veach won the 2011 U.S. F2000 National Championship season opener at Sebring International Raceway. Veach finished fourth in series points.

Star Mazda Championship
Veach made his Star Mazda Championship debut for Andretti Autosport at Infineon Raceway in August 2011. He also competed in the series' season finale at Mazda Raceway Laguna Seca, where he finished third. He competed in the full season for Andretti Autosport in the #77 car in 2012, finishing tenth in points with a best finish of third at Lucas Oil Raceway at Indianapolis.

Indy Lights
Veach moved up to Indy Lights with Andretti Autosport in 2013. Veach led the most laps and finished on the podium in third at the Milwaukee Mile and won the pole at Auto Club Speedway on his way to seventh in points. He remained in the series and Andretti Autosport in 2014. He collected three wins and nine podiums in 14 races to end third in the standings behind Gabby Chaves and Jack Harvey. After sitting out of the 2015 season due to an injury which required hand surgery, Veach returned to Indy Lights in 2016 with Belardi Auto Racing.  After a rough start, where he suffered a mechanical failure while dominating the first race in St. Petersburg, he went on to collect 3 wins as well as several podium finishes throughout the 18 race season.

Amazingly, during his Indy Lights racing career, Zach finished in the top 10 in 43 of the 44 races he competed in, or 97.73%.

IndyCar Series

He made his IndyCar Series debut at the 2017 Honda Indy Grand Prix of Alabama as a last-minute replacement driver for the injured J. R. Hildebrand.  Despite the short notice and a limited amount of time to become familiar with the car prior to the event, he managed to close the performance gap to teammate Spencer Pigot in each session, from 1.5 second behind in the first practice to 1.1 in the second, 0.8 in the third and just 0.5 in qualifying.  Veach started 19th and ran as high as fourth in the race, after pitting off-sequence, before finishing in 19th place, the last car on the lead lap.

Veach competed at the 2017 Indianapolis 500 for A. J. Foyt Enterprises, placing 26th, when he retired on lap 155 with mechanical issues.

On September 11, 2017 it was announced that Veach had reached an agreement to drive Andretti Autosport's fourth IndyCar full-time for the 2018 IndyCar Series season. The contract is three years in length.

On September 23, 2020, Andretti Autosport announced that Veach would be leaving the team ahead of the Harvest GP.

IMSA
For the 2021 season, Veach was signed by Vasser Sullivan Racing to drive a GTD-class Lexus RC at the IMSA SportsCar Championship, partnering with Frankie Montecalvo.

Distracted driving campaign
Veach has been very outspoken about his interest in putting an end to distracted driving.  On April 30, 2010, Veach attended the taping of The Oprah Winfrey Show's focus on the No Phone Zone program.  At the program he met Jennifer Smith, founder and president of FocusDriven, the official beneficiary from Winfrey's No Phone Zone, and later became FocusDriven's national spokesperson.  In May 2010, Veach campaigned to gain support from professional racecar drivers to support Winfrey's No Phone Zone. Veach announced on June 4, 2010, he had added 33 Indy 500 drivers support of the No Phone Zone, including that of Danica Patrick and Hélio Castroneves, among others.

In July 2010, Veach released an anti-texting app, which automatically responds to a text message received by the phone.

On September 21, 2010, Veach attended the 2010 National Distracted Driving Summit where he was honored by United States Secretary of Transportation Ray LaHood, in addition to the Jonas Brothers and Jordin Sparks for their collective efforts to put an end to distracted driving.

Musical career

Veach will star in the Indianapolis Opera's production of Gaetano Donizetti's comic opera Elixir of Love, to be held in November 2019.

Racing record

U.S. F2000 National Championship

Star Mazda Championship

Indy Lights

IndyCar Series
(key)

* Season still in progress.

Indianapolis 500

Complete WeatherTech SportsCar Championship results
(key) (Races in bold indicate pole position; races in italics indicate fastest lap)

† Points only counted towards the WeatherTech Sprint Cup and not the overall GTD Championship.

References

External links

1994 births
Living people
IndyCar Series drivers
Indianapolis 500 drivers
Indy Lights drivers
Indy Pro 2000 Championship drivers
People from Pike County, Ohio
Racing drivers from Ohio
U.S. F2000 National Championship drivers
24 Hours of Daytona drivers
Ed Carpenter Racing drivers
WeatherTech SportsCar Championship drivers
Andretti Autosport drivers
AFS Racing drivers
Belardi Auto Racing drivers
A. J. Foyt Enterprises drivers
JDC Motorsports drivers